Kuzmice may refer to:

 Kuzmice in the Topoľčany District, Slovakia
 Kuzmice in the Trebišov District, Slovakia